The 2016 World Rowing Championships was the 46th edition and held from 21 to 28 August 2016 at the Willem-Alexander Baan in Rotterdam, Netherlands in conjunction with the World Junior Rowing Championships and the World Rowing U23 Championships. The annual week-long rowing regatta is organized by FISA (the International Rowing Federation), and held at the end of the northern hemisphere summer. Because the 2016 Summer Olympics and the 2016 Summer Paralympics were the major rowing events in 2016, the World Championships programme was limited to non-Olympic events, non-Paralympic events, and the World Rowing Junior Championships were held at the same time, and also the World Rowing U23 Championships.

Medal summary

Medal table

Events
The lightweight men's eight was discontinued after the 2015 World Rowing Championships due to low participation in three consecutive championships.

Event codes

See also
 Rowing at the 2016 Summer Olympics
 World Rowing Junior Championships 2016
 2016 World Rowing U23 Championships

References

External links

Official website
WorldRowing website

 
2016
Rowing competitions in the Netherlands
International sports competitions hosted by the Netherlands
Sports competitions in Rotterdam
2016 in Dutch sport
2016 in rowing
August 2016 sports events in Europe